This is a list of the players who were on the rosters of the teams who participated in the 2004 Summer Olympics for men's basketball.

Group A

Argentina

The following is the Argentina roster in the men's basketball tournament of the 2004 Summer Olympics.

China

The following is the China roster in the men's basketball tournament of the 2004 Summer Olympics.

Italy

The following is the Italy roster in the men's basketball tournament of the 2004 Summer Olympics.

New Zealand

The following is the New Zealand roster in the men's basketball tournament of the 2004 Summer Olympics.

Serbia and Montenegro

The following is the Serbia and Montenegro roster in the men's basketball tournament of the 2004 Summer Olympics.

Spain

The following is the Spain roster in the men's basketball tournament of the 2004 Summer Olympics.

Group B

Angola

The following is the Angola roster in the men's basketball tournament of the 2004 Summer Olympics.

Australia

The following is the Australia roster in the men's basketball tournament of the 2004 Summer Olympics.

Greece

The following is the Greece roster in the men's basketball tournament of the 2004 Summer Olympics.

Lithuania

The following is the Lithuania roster in the men's basketball tournament of the 2004 Summer Olympics.

Puerto Rico

The following is the Puerto Rico roster in the men's basketball tournament of the 2004 Summer Olympics.

United States

The following is the United States roster in the men's basketball tournament of the 2004 Summer Olympics.

References

External links
Official Olympic Report

squads
2004